Sergei Vasilyevich Lukyanenko (born 11 April 1968) is a Russian science fiction and fantasy author, writing in Russian. His works often feature intense action-packed plots, interwoven with the moral dilemma of keeping one's humanity while being strong.

Some of his works have been adapted into film productions, for which he wrote the screenplays.

Biography
Lukyanenko was born in Karatau, Kazakhstan, then a part of the Soviet Union. After graduating from school, he moved to Alma-Ata, and enrolled at the Alma-Ata State Medical Institute in 1986 majoring in psychotherapy. He had started writing as a student, and in 1992 had just started making money from it. During this time he became an active member in Russian fandom, visiting conventions and attending seminars all around the Soviet Union. In 1996 he moved to Moscow where he currently resides.

Name transliteration
Lukyanenko's name is romanized as Sergey Lukianenko on the English version of his official website and as Sergei Lukyanenko by his publisher on works translated into English. Other spellings such as Sergey Lukyanenko are also found.

Writing career

Early years
Lukyanenko started writing in the mid-1980s, and his first publication, the short story "Misconduct" ("Where The Mean Enemy Lurks", although written earlier, was published later), followed soon in 1988. Science fiction in the Soviet Union was exposed to political control, as it was viewed chiefly as a political tool rather than an art. In the late 1980s, however, it was viewed somewhat benevolently, and he was able to jump on the bandwagon of the state support, attending a number of literary seminars and publishing several novellas and short stories.

First works of this period show the clear influence of the Russian children's author and teacher Vladislav Krapivin, whose fan Lukyanenko remains up to this day. These works, such as the novella Eighth Color of Rainbow, feature the same themes of coming of age, loyalty and friendship, as well as teenage protagonists and a similar target audience. However, Lukyanenko soon moved from imitating Krapivin toward a more polemic view of his idealistic views of children and their interaction. In the 1994 novel Knights of Forty Islands, Lukyanenko established himself as an author of the Goldingian tradition.

After dissolution of the Soviet Union
After the dissolution of the Soviet Union and the switch to the market economy, Russian authors now had to struggle with unfamiliar realities of a free publishing system. The hopes of a creative boom never materialized, as publishers were eager to exploit the lucrative pulp literature market (virtually nonexistent before) largely ignoring the existing literature establishment. This led to rather low confidence in domestic authors, and it was extremely hard to find a publisher ready to invest in a local writer.

Lukyanenko, though, fared somewhat better than the others, already having made something of a name in Russian science fiction circles. Nascent computer networks (mainly FidoNet), distributing electronic copies of his works, also helped to create demand for printed versions. Another contribution was his writing style, combining intricate but captivating plots with deep intrigue and concentrated action.

His books at the time included the aforementioned Knights of the 40 Islands, plus Nuclear Dream, a collection of short stories and novellas, published in 1992, and two space opera trilogies: Line of Delirium, the setting of which was loosely based on that of the Master of Orion series of video games, and the earlier Lord from Planet Earth, based on the dark setting brought forth in his early short stories (entitled A Splendid Faraway Universe). Autumn Visits, was also written during that time, when the author was struggling with depression.

Labyrinth of Reflections, a book heavily based on various internet subcultures and cyberpunk mythos, is another product of this period. Although Labyrinth is often labeled as cyberpunk, it is a rather straight romance story, hardly meeting Dozois criterion, and, more to the fact, was written when the author did not even have an Internet connection; all his internet knowledge was limited to FIDONet membership.

After moving from Kazakhstan to Moscow, he continued to write there, now often venturing into literary experiments – like the religiously themed alternative history dilogy Seekers of the Sky, where he experimented with language stylization. He also continued several series started in his earlier period, and started several new ones (often in his favorite genre of space opera) – like the Genome series, now featuring two novels (Genome and Dances on the Snow) and the Cripples novella, or The Stars Are Cold Toys dilogy, sharing the same themes with David Brin's Uplift series.

Breakthrough
The novel Night Watch marked Lukyanenko's return to the fantasy genre, which he repeatedly visited during his career, but never ventured into seriously. Even in this novel he stayed in the less radical realm of urban fantasy; however, his gloomy but picturesque settings and vivid characters brought him a considerable success. He struck gold when improvements in the Russian economy permitted financing which revitalized a dormant domestic movie industry.

The 2004 film Night Watch (Nochnoy dozor), based on the book, was regarded as "the first Russian blockbuster." The film grossed over $16 million in Russia, a box office record at that time. In the United States, an adaptation of the film was released by Fox Searchlight. The film Day Watch (Dnevnoy dozor) was released in Russia on January 1, 2006, and it was released in the US on June 1, 2007.

He also released a number of sequels to the Watch series. In addition to the sequels, he published a short story Kid Watch (Melkiy dozor) featuring a teenage agent of the Day Watch who is also the son of a member of the Russian counter-intelligence service which monitors the Others.

Since then, a number of other movie adaptations of his books have been considered. To date, only one of these projects, a 2005 children's film Asiris Nuna, based on Today, Mother!, a humor novella coauthored with Yuli Burkin, has been completed; several other movies, however, seem to remain in production. In many of these projects Lukyanenko acts as both scriptwriter and consultant.

In the meantime, several other books have been released by him, such as the deeply philosophical, non-series novel Spectrum which deals with the themes of existentialism and omnipotence, among others. He also published a closely connected series, the novels Rough Draft and Final Draft.

Foreign releases
Until 2006 relatively few of Lukyanenko's works had been released outside of Russia, mostly in Baltic states, Bulgaria and Poland, countries with traditionally strong ties with Russian literature. Even fewer were commercially published in English. However, success of the movies finally changed the situation. Night Watch, translated by Andrew Bromfield, was published in English in July 2006, Day Watch followed in January 2007, Twilight Watch was published in July 2007. 2009 saw the international publication of Last Watch by Hyperion Press. Labyrinth of Reflections, published originally in 1997, was also translated and published in other languages.

Literary analysis
Lukyanenko himself said that his work has been heavily influenced by that of Robert A. Heinlein, the Strugatsky brothers and Vladislav Krapivin, and that he hopes to be remembered as a literary follower of the Strugatsky brothers. Although his books are often set in harsh worlds, Lukyanenko is a humanist writer, and in this sense believes he follows in the footsteps of the Strugatsky brothers. In May 2000, Boris Strugatsky referred to the spirit of the brothers' books as "that goodness with fists, those tortured attempts by the heroes to remain kind while being strong", and added "this is the underlying theme for Lukyanenko: how to preserve your goodness in the world of evil when you are strong and well-armed."

Position on politics
Lukyanenko has been known as an avid supporter of copyright, i. e. harsh measures against copyright infringement, traditionally widespread among Russian readership. During the large meeting of various authors and business people titled "Copyright defense on internet" in 2013 he complained that "only 1% of all downloads of his latest book were legal downloads".

Lukyanenko kept a blog at LiveJournal, posting both personal and public information or snippets of a book in progress. On his website and his blog, Lukyanenko has repeatedly spoken out against the international adoption of Russian orphans, especially by Americans. His first blog was discontinued on 11 July 2008 after a conflict with readers over the issue. He started another blog a few days later, promising firmer moderation policies. Lukyanenko welcomed the Dima Yakovlev Law banning the international adoption of children from Russia in response to the US Magnitsky Act. 

Consistently promoting sharply anti-Ukraine views in his books, Lukyanenko condemned the Euromaidan movement of 2013–4, saying that it would be followed by a forced Ukrainization, which is "as much of a crime as a forced sex change". Lukyanenko, having Ukrainian ancestry himself, threatened authors supporting the Euromaidan that he would make every effort to prevent their books being published in Russia. He also forbade translation of his books into the Ukrainian language. He welcomed the March 2014 annexation of Crimea by the Russian Federation.

In February 2014 Lukyanenko announced boycott of Denmark because of the culling of a giraffe at the Copenhagen Zoo.

On 28 February 2022, Lukyanenko was the leading signatory of a public letter with a few other authors supporting Russian military invasion of Ukraine launched four days earlier. The letter makes allegations of NATO's "secret plans to destroy Russia", Western countries' "embracement of Nazis", calls the 2014 Crimean status referendum legitimate and "free", and claims Russia's invasion aimed at "bringing peace in Europe".

On 3 September 2022, at Chicon 8, the World Science Fiction Society passed a resolution condemning Lukyanenko's pro-invasion views and asking that he be disinvited as Guest of Honor at the 2023 Worldcon in Chengdu.

In late October 2022, Lukyanenko appeared as a guest on the RT show of Anton Krasovsky when Krasovsky mocked rapes of Ukrainian civilians by Russian soldiers and called for Ukrainian children to be drowned or burned alive and the rest of the country shot. "Whoever says that Moscow occupied them, you drown them in a river with a strong undercurrent [...] shove them into huts and burn them up." When asked how Russia could annex Ukraine when this would mean incorporating many people who did not wish to live under Russian rule, Krasovsky suggested: "So we shoot them."

Bibliography

Short stories
"Misconduct"
"H is for Human"
"Nuclear Dream"
"Gadget"

Novels
The Boy and the Darkness
Autumn Visits
Not the Time for Dragons
Dances on the Snow
Spectrum
Competitors
QuaZi

Series
A Lord from Planet Earth
Island Russia
Line of Delirium
Labyrinth of Reflections
Genome

Tetralogy
Knights of Forty Islands
The Stars Are Cold Toys
Cold Coasts
Rough Draft

Hexalogy 
Night Watch
Day Watch
Twilight Watch
Last Watch
New Watch
Sixth Watch

Awards

Footnotes

References
 Townsend, Dorian Aleksandra, From Upyr' to Vampire: The Slavic Vampire Myth in Russian Literature, Ph.D. Dissertation, School of German and Russian Studies, Faculty of Arts & Social Sciences, University of New South Wales, May 2011.
 Stephanie Dreier, "The ethics of urban and epic Russian fantasy," Canadian Slavonic Papers 60, no. 1-2 (2018)

External links

 Official site
 Sergey Lukyanenko at Russian SF (English)
 Sergey Lukyanenko, Night-and-Day-Watching Writer
 

 
1968 births
Living people
Russian male novelists
Russian fantasy writers
Russian psychiatrists
Russian speculative fiction critics
Russian science fiction writers
Kazakhstani speculative fiction writers
Tatar people of Russia
Russian people of Ukrainian descent
Soviet psychiatrists
Cyberpunk writers
Russian bloggers
Kazakhstani bloggers
Male bloggers
Anti-Ukrainian sentiment in Russia